Skiöld is a Swedish surname that refer to
Birgit Skiöld (1923–1982), Swedish printmaker and modernist artist
Lars-Erik Skiöld (1952–2017), Swedish wrestler
Leif Skiöld (1935–2014), Swedish football and ice hockey player
Ossian Skiöld (1889–1961), Swedish hammer thrower

See also
Skjöldr

Swedish-language surnames